The Church of Saint John the Evangelist, or John's Church, is a Gothic Revival style church in Kilkenny, Ireland. The Church was designed by William Hague and built from 1903 to 1908 on the site of an earlier church located in the graveyard. The grounds contain a trees and greenery.

History

It was built as the O'Loughlin Memorial Church by the O'Loughlin family of Sandford's Court. The site was donated by James Butler, the third Marquess of Ormonde. It was built to designs by William Hague (c.1840-99),  under the supervision of William Henry Byrne (1866–1917).

Architecture
The lack of ornamentation to the summit indicates that the additional stage and spire projected by Byrne in association with William Hogan was never executed.

External links

 Buildings of Ireland Record

Roman Catholic churches in Kilkenny (city)
20th-century Roman Catholic church buildings in Ireland
Roman Catholic churches completed in 1908
1908 establishments in Ireland
20th-century churches in the Republic of Ireland